Westbeemster is a town in the Dutch province of North Holland. It is a part of the former municipality of Beemster, and lies about 9 km northwest of Purmerend. Since 2022 it has been part of the municipality of Purmerend.

In 2001, the town of Westbeemster had 117 inhabitants. The built-up area of the town was 0.04 km², and contained 40 residences.  The larger statistical district "Westbeemster" has a population of around 360. By 2020, the town population had increased to 810 inhabitants.

References

Populated places in North Holland
Geography of Purmerend